Danderesso is a small town and rural commune in the Cercle of Sikasso in the Sikasso Region of southern Mali. The commune covers an area of 1,645 square kilometers and includes the town and 30 villages. In the 2009 census it had a population of 41,723. The town of Danderesso, the chef-lieu of the commune, is 28 km northeast of Sikasso.

References

External links
.

Communes of Sikasso Region